Gastrodes abietum, the spruce cone bug, is a species of dirt-colored seed bug in the family Rhyparochromidae. It is found in the Palearctic.

References

External links

 

Rhyparochromidae